Alosa agone is a species of ray-finned fish in the genus Alosa. It is an endangered species.

Species description
Alosa agone are common in the Mediterranean and the western Balkans. There are also landlocked populations found in Italy. The distribution of reproductive communities and the conservation status of Alosa agone in the central and eastern parts of the Mediterranean areas are poorly known.

Conservation
The numbers of Alosa agone have declined due to barriers such as dams in their local areas. These barriers prevent them from getting upstream to their spawning grounds and reproducing. Improved water quality in some landlocked lakes have increased their numbers in recent years.

Biology
The "twaite shad" are known to be very adaptive and variable as they form landlocked populations in Italy and its neighboring areas, including the western Balkans. They can modify their morphology and biology according to their environment. Therefore, Alosa agone, just like many Alosa species, can be either marine or freshwater fish.

References

agone
Fish of the Mediterranean Sea
Freshwater fish of Europe
Marine fish of Europe
Fauna of the Balkans
Fish described in 1786